Big Ndrova Island, sometimes called simply Ndrova Island, is an island of Manus Province, Papua New Guinea, one of the Admiralty Islands.

References

Islands of Papua New Guinea